Glenforest Secondary School (GFSS) is a public secondary school located in Mississauga, Ontario, Canada. Established in 1969, Glenforest Secondary School is a member of the Peel District School Board.

The school mascot is the mythological creature the gryphon,  nicknamed Griffy. The Glenforest Gryphons are the official sports team of the school. Glenforest Gryphons excel in a variety of sports, including badminton, soccer, table tennis, swimming, ball hockey, and cricket. Many Gryphons compete in provincial competitions in their respective sport.

International Baccalaureate (IB) 
Glenforest has been recognized as an International Baccalaureate World School since November 2004. It offers the IB program from grades 9-12 with a vast range of subjects included. The IB program is sub-divided into two stages: MYP (Middle Years Programme) and IB. MYP is the initialization and preparation for the students entering the official IB program in grade 11.

The IB Mission Statement 
The International Baccalaureate Organization (IBO) aims to develop inquiring, knowledgeable, and caring young people who help to create a better and more peaceful world through intercultural understanding and respect.

Clubs and Activities 
Glenforest offers numerous clubs and activities to its students. The major ones are (as of November 2022):

Building Our Safe Schools (BOSS)
Student Activity Council (SAC)
Yearbook Team
Athletic Council
Math Club
HOSA
Glenforest EcoClub
FBLA 
Student Writers' Guild
FIRST Robotics Competition Team 6070 Gryphon Machine
Glenforest STEM 
Computer Science Club
GAMA (Glenforest Association of Musical Arts)
Talon Times (newspaper)
International Baccalaureate Student League (IBSL)
Glenforest Peer Helpers (pH)
Glenforest Art Guild
Glenforest Debate Society
Prom Committee
Chess Club
Science Club 
Swim Team 
GFSS Welcome Team
Glenforest Dance Club 
United Way Committee
Model United Nations
Women With Vision
MEDLIFE
Unicef On Campus Glenforest

Demographics 
The curriculum covers a wide variety of cultures, and academic programs. Currently, the school offers the International Baccalaureate Program, in both its MYP (Middle Years Program) and DP (Diploma Program) varieties. Academic and Applied level students account for roughly half of the school demographic, with the other half populated by IB students. The school is also widely known for being very multicultural.

Athletics
The Gryphons are the official sports team. The school has teams active in many sports and recreational activities.  There are many other sports available to the students as well. The school participated in the non-profit fundraiser known as The Inside Ride to help raise money for cancer research. This included riding indoor bicycles for a total of an hour inside the school gym. Students formed teams to raise money and each team dressed up in their respective themes to relayed the bike ride throughout the hour. The school recently underwent a gym renovation in 2014, after a flooding wrecked the original gym floor dating back to 1969. The school specializes in sports such as badminton, volleyball, ball hockey, flag football, cricket, soccer, rugby, table tennis, and track and field.

The Glenforest Pool 
Glenforest Secondary is well known for its swimming pool. The pool is available for the residents of Mississauga for recreational purposes as it has been owned and operated by the city for 25 years. It is a 25-meter-long, 6 lane, rectangular shaped pool located inside the school. Some activities facilitated are Scuba diving and swimming.
Additionally, the Glenforest Swim Team conducts frequent swimming practices in the pool on weekdays.

See also
 List of high schools in Ontario

Notes

External links 
 

Peel District School Board
High schools in Mississauga
International Baccalaureate schools in Ontario
Educational institutions established in 1969
1969 establishments in Ontario